Events from the year 1307 in the Kingdom of Scotland.

Incumbents
Monarch – Robert I

Events
 February – Battle of Turnberry
 9/10 February – Battle of Loch Ryan
 March – Battle of Glen Trool
 10 May – Battle of Loudoun Hill
 December – Battle of Slioch

Deaths
 9 February:
 Alexander de Brus younger brother of Robert the Bruce, captured at Battle of Loch Ryan and later executed (born c.1285)
 Thomas de Brus, younger brother of Robert the Bruce, captured at Battle of Loch Ryan and later executed (born c.1284)
Undated

 William de Moravia, 2nd Earl of Sutherland (born c. 1235)

See also

 Timeline of Scottish history

References

 
14th century in Scotland
Wars of Scottish Independence